In linear algebra, the Strassen algorithm, named after Volker Strassen, is an algorithm for matrix multiplication. It is faster than the standard matrix multiplication algorithm for large matrices, with a better asymptotic complexity, although the naive algorithm is often better for smaller matrices. The Strassen algorithm is slower than the fastest known algorithms for extremely large matrices, but such galactic algorithms are not useful in practice, as they are much slower for matrices of practical size. For small matrices even faster algorithms exist.

Strassen's algorithm works for any ring, such as plus/multiply, but not all semirings, such as min-plus or boolean algebra, where the naive algorithm still works, and so called combinatorial matrix multiplication.

History 
Volker Strassen first published this algorithm in 1969 and thereby proved that the  general matrix multiplication algorithm was not optimal. The Strassen algorithm's publication resulted in more research about matrix multiplication that led to both asymptotically lower bounds and improved computational upper bounds.

Algorithm 

Let ,  be two square matrices over a ring , for example matrices whose entries are integers or the real numbers. The goal of matrix multiplication is to calculate the matrix product . The following exposition of the algorithm assumes that all of these matrices have sizes that are powers of two (i.e.), but this is only conceptually necessary -- if the matrices ,  are not of type , the "missing" rows and columns can be filled with zeros to obtain matrices with sizes of powers of two -- though real implementations of the algorithm do not do this in practice.

The Strassen algorithm partitions ,  and  into equally sized block matrices

The naive algorithm would be:

 

This construction does not reduce the number of multiplications: 8 multiplications of matrix blocks are still needed to calculate the  matrices, the same number of multiplications needed when using standard matrix multiplication.

The Strassen algorithm defines instead new matrices:

 

using only 7 multiplications (one for each ) instead of 8.

 

We recursively iterate this division process until the submatrices degenerate into numbers (elements of the ring ).

Practical implementations of Strassen's algorithm switch to standard methods of matrix multiplication for small enough submatrices, for which those algorithms are more efficient. The particular crossover point for which Strassen's algorithm is more efficient depends on the specific implementation and hardware. Earlier authors had estimated that Strassen's algorithm is faster for matrices with widths from 32 to 128 for optimized implementations. However, it has been observed that this crossover point has been increasing in recent years, and a 2010 study found that even a single step of Strassen's algorithm is often not beneficial on current architectures, compared to a highly optimized traditional multiplication, until matrix sizes exceed 1000 or more, and even for matrix sizes of several thousand the benefit is typically marginal at best (around 10% or less).  A more recent study (2016) observed benefits for matrices as small as 512 and a benefit around 20%.

Winograd form 

It is possible to reduce the number of matrix additions by instead using the following form discovered by Winograd:

where u = (c - a)(C - D), v = (c + d)(C - A), w = aA + (c + d - a)(A + D - C). This reduces the number of matrix additions and subtractions from 18 to 15. The number of matrix multiplications is still 7, and the asymptotic complexity is the same.

Asymptotic complexity 

The outline of the algorithm above showed that one can get away with just 7, instead of the traditional 8, matrix-matrix multiplications for the sub-blocks of the matrix. On the other hand, one has to do additions and subtractions of blocks, though this is of no concern for the overall complexity: Adding matrices of size  requires only  operations whereas multiplication is substantially more expensive (traditionally  addition or multiplication operations).

The number of additions and multiplications required in the Strassen algorithm can be calculated as follows: let  be the number of operations for a  matrix. Then by recursive application of the Strassen algorithm, we see that , for some constant  that depends on the number of additions performed at each application of the algorithm. The reduction in the number of arithmetic operations however comes at the price of a somewhat reduced numerical stability, and the algorithm also requires significantly more memory compared to the naive algorithm. Both initial matrices must have their dimensions expanded to the next power of 2, which results in storing up to four times as many elements, and the seven auxiliary matrices each contain a quarter of the elements in the expanded ones.

Strassen's algorithm needs to be compared to the "naive" way of doing the matrix multiplication that would require 8 instead of 7 multiplications of sub-blocks. This would then give rise to the complexity one expects from the standard approach: . The comparison of these two algorithms shows that asymptotically, Strassen's algorithm is faster: There exists a size  so that matrices that are larger are more efficiently multiplied with Strassen's algorithm than the "traditional" way. However, the asymptotic statement does not imply that Strassen's algorithm is always faster even for small matrices, and in practice this is in fact not the case: For small matrices, the cost of the additional additions of matrix blocks outweighs the savings in the number of multiplications. There are also other factors not captured by the analysis above, such as the difference in cost on today's hardware between loading data from memory onto processors vs. the cost of actually doing operations on this data. As a consequence of these sorts of considerations, Strassen's algorithm is typically only used on "large" matrices. This kind of effect is even more pronounced with alternative algorithms such as the one by Coppersmith and Winograd: While asymptotically even faster, the cross-over point  is so large that the algorithm is not generally used on matrices one encounters in practice.

Rank or bilinear complexity 
The bilinear complexity or rank of a bilinear map is an important concept in the asymptotic complexity of matrix multiplication.  The rank of a bilinear map  over a field F is defined as (somewhat of an abuse of notation)

In other words, the rank of a bilinear map is the length of its shortest bilinear computation.  The existence of Strassen's algorithm shows that the rank of  matrix multiplication is no more than seven.  To see this, let us express this algorithm (alongside the standard algorithm) as such a bilinear computation.  In the case of matrices, the dual spaces A* and B* consist of maps into the field F induced by a scalar double-dot product, (i.e. in this case the sum of all the entries of a Hadamard product.)

It can be shown that the total number of elementary multiplications  required for matrix multiplication is tightly asymptotically bound to the rank , i.e. , or more specifically, since the constants are known, . One useful property of the rank is that it is submultiplicative for tensor products, and this enables one to show that  matrix multiplication can be accomplished with no more than  elementary multiplications for any .  (This -fold tensor product of the  matrix multiplication map with itself — an -th tensor power—is realized by the recursive step in the algorithm shown.)

Cache behavior
Strassen's algorithm is cache oblivious. Analysis of its cache behavior algorithm has shown it to incur

cache misses during its execution, assuming an idealized cache of size  (i.e. with  lines of length ).

Implementation considerations 

The description above states that the matrices are square, and the size is a power of two, and that padding should be used if needed. This restriction allows the matrices to be split in half, recursively, until limit of scalar multiplication is reached. The restriction simplifies the explanation, and analysis of complexity, but is not actually necessary;
and in fact, padding the matrix as described will increase the computation time and can easily eliminate the fairly narrow time savings obtained by using the method in the first place.

A good implementation will observe the following:

 It is not necessary or desirable to use the Strassen algorithm down to the limit of scalars. Compared to conventional matrix multiplication, the algorithm adds a considerable  workload in addition/subtractions; so below a certain size, it will be better to use conventional multiplication.
 The method can indeed be applied to square matrices of any dimension. If the dimension is even, they are split in half as described. If the dimension is odd, zero padding by one row and one column is applied first. Such padding can be applied on-the-fly and lazily, and the extra rows and columns discarded as the result is formed. Note, for instance, that the product  is only used in the lower row of the output, so is only required to be  rows high; and thus the left factor  used to generate it need only be  rows high; accordingly, there is no need to pad that sum to  rows; it is only necessary to pad  to  columns to match .

Furthermore, there is no need for the matrices to be square. Non-square matrices can be split in half using the same methods, yielding smaller non-square matrices. If the matrices are sufficiently non-square it will be worthwhile reducing the initial operation to more square products, using simple methods which are essentially  ,  for instance:

 A product of size  can be done as 20 separate  operations, arranged to form the result;
 A product of size  can be done as 10 separate  operations, summed to form the result.

These techniques will make the implementation more complicated, compared to simply padding to a power-of-two square; however, it is a reasonable assumption that anyone undertaking an implementation of Strassen, rather than conventional multiplication, will place a higher priority on computational efficiency than on simplicity of the implementation.

In practice, Strassen's algorithm can be implemented to attain better performance than conventional multiplication even for small matrices, for matrices that are not at all square, and without requiring workspace beyond buffers that are already needed for a high-performance conventional multiplication.

See also 
 Computational complexity of mathematical operations
 Gauss–Jordan elimination
 Coppersmith–Winograd algorithm
 Z-order matrix representation
 Karatsuba algorithm, for multiplying n-digit integers in  instead of in  time
 Toom-Cook algorithm, a faster generalization of the Karatsuba algorithm that permits recursive divide-and-conquer decomposition into more than 2 blocks at a time
 Gauss's complex multiplication algorithm multiplies two complex numbers using 3 real multiplications instead of 4

References 

 Thomas H. Cormen, Charles E. Leiserson, Ronald L. Rivest, and Clifford Stein. Introduction to Algorithms, Second Edition. MIT Press and McGraw-Hill, 2001. . Chapter 28: Section 28.2: Strassen's algorithm for matrix multiplication, pp. 735–741.

External links
 (also includes formulas for fast matrix inversion)
Tyler J. Earnest, Strassen's Algorithm on the Cell Broadband Engine

Matrix multiplication algorithms